In season 2003–04 Celtic won a double of the Scottish Premier League championship and the Scottish Cup. They reached the quarter-finals of the Scottish League Cup, and the UEFA Cup after competing in the group stage of the Champions League. They set a new record for the most goals scored in a season – 105 goals.

Competitions
Results for Celtic F.C. for season 2003–2004.

NOTE: scores are written Celtic first

Key:
SPL = Scottish Premier League
SC = Scottish Cup
SLC = Scottish League Cup
CLQ = Champions League Qualifier
CLA – Champions League Group A
CL = Champions League Match
UC = UEFA Cup match
F = Friendly match

Squad

Left club during season

Player statistics

Appearances and goals

List of squad players, including number of appearances by competition

|}

Team statistics

League table

Transfers

In

Out

See also
 List of Celtic F.C. seasons

References

Celtic F.C. seasons
Celtic
Scottish football championship-winning seasons